The Ilha Anchieta State Park is a state park in the state of São Paulo, Brazil

Location

The Ilha Anchieta State Park covers the Ilha Anchieta, an offshore island in the Atlantic Ocean in the municipality of Ubatuba, São Paulo. 
It is south of the town of Ubatuba, east of the city of São Paulo.
The park is part of the Bocaina Mosaic of conservation units.

Nature
The park is home to many species of terrestrial and oceanic species including endangered species, and conservational approaches have been made. Some of these are quatis, Atlantic goliath grouper, southern right whale, Bryde's whale, and dolphins.

History

When Europeans arrived in the 16th century the island was occupied by the Tupinambá people.
Until 1934 it was known as the Ilha do Porcos (Pig Island).
The island was used as a prison for common criminals until 1955, when there was a great prisoner rebellion.

The Ilha Anchieta State Park was created by the governor of São Paulo, Paulo Egydio Martins, by decree 9.629 of 29 March 1977.
This reversed a prior decree that gave administration of the island to the department of urbanization and improvement of resorts. 
The purpose was to ensure full protection of natural resources, and to install a laboratory for scientific purposes to encourage mariculture.

Notes

Sources

State parks of Brazil
Protected areas of São Paulo (state)
1977 establishments in Brazil